This list of military awards and decorations of World War II is an index to articles on notable military awards presented by the combatants during World War II.

Allied Powers

Australia 

 Atlantic Star
 Air Crew Europe Star
 Arctic Star
 Africa Star
 Pacific Star
 Burma Star
 Italy Star
 France and Germany Star
 Defence Medal
 War Medal, 1939–45
 Australia Service Medal 1939–45

Greece
Cross of Valour
War Cross
Medal of Military Merit

Soviet Union
Hero of the Soviet Union
Order of the Red Banner
Order of Lenin
Order of Suvorov
Order of Kutuzov
Order of Ushakov
Order of Nakhimov
Order of Glory
Order of Alexander Nevsky
Order of the Patriotic War
Order of the Red Star
Medal "For the Victory over Germany in the Great Patriotic War 1941–1945"
Medal "For the Victory over Japan"
Medal "For the Defence of Leningrad"
Medal "For the Defence of Odessa"
Medal "For the Defence of Sevastopol"
Medal "For the Defence of Stalingrad"
Medal "For the Defence of Moscow"
Medal "For the Defence of the Caucasus"
Medal "For the Defence of the Soviet Transarctic"
Medal "For the Defence of Kiev"
Medal "For the Capture of Berlin"
Medal "For the Capture of Vienna"
Medal "For the Capture of Königsberg"
Medal "For the Capture of Budapest"
Medal "For the Liberation of Prague"
Medal "For the Liberation of Warsaw"
Medal "For the Liberation of Belgrade"

In the Soviet Union orders and medals were also awarded to cities, factories, ships and military units.

United States

Medal of Honor
Navy Cross
Distinguished Service Cross
Distinguished Service Medal
Navy Distinguished Service Medal
Legion of Merit
Silver Star
Bronze Star
Soldier's Medal
Navy and Marine Corps Medal
Purple Heart
Distinguished Flying Cross
Air Medal
World War II Victory Medal
American Defense Service Medal
Asiatic-Pacific Campaign Medal
European-African-Middle Eastern Campaign Medal
American Campaign Medal

United Kingdom
Victoria Cross
George Cross
Order of the Bath
Order of the British Empire
Distinguished Service Order
Distinguished Service Cross
Military Cross
Distinguished Flying Cross
Air Force Cross
Distinguished Conduct Medal
Conspicuous Gallantry Medal
Distinguished Service Medal
Military Medal
Distinguished Flying Medal
Air Force Medal
Burma Gallantry Medal
George Medal
Mention in Despatches
1939–1945 Star
Atlantic Star
Air Crew Europe Star
Africa Star
Pacific Star
Burma Star
Italy Star
France and Germany Star
Defence Medal
War Medal 1939–1945

France
Légion d'honneur à titre militaire 
Croix de guerre 1939–1945 
Médaille militaire 
Resistance Medal 
Order of Liberation 
Combatant's Cross 
1939–1945 Commemorative war medal 
Médaille de la France libérée
Fourragère

Belgium
Croix de guerre
Maritime Medal 1940–1945 
Medal of the Armed Resistance 1940–1945 
Political Prisoner's Cross 1940–1945 
Civilian Resistance Medal 
Prisoner of War Medal 1940–1945 
1940–1945 Military Combatant's Medal 
Volunteer's Medal 1940–1945 
1940–1945 African War Medal 
1940–1945 Colonial War Effort Medal
Fourragère

Netherlands
Military Order of William
Dutch Cross of Resistance
Bronze Lion
Resistance Star East Asia
Bronze Cross
Cross of Merit
Airman's Cross
Honorary Medal for Charitable Assistance

Luxembourg
Military Medal
Luxembourg War Cross
Order of the Resistance

Poland
Virtuti Militari
Order Krzyża Grunwaldu
Order Krzyża Niepodległości
Krzyż Walecznych (Cross of the Valorous)
Krzyż Zasługi z Mieczami (Cross of Merit with Swords)
Medal Wojska (Army Medal for War 1939–45)
Medal Lotniczy (Air Force Medal for War 1939–45)
Medal Morski (Navy Medal for War 1939–45)
Medal Morski Polskiej Marynarki Handlowej (Merchant Marine Medal for War 1939–45)
Krzyż Kampanii Wrześniowej 1939 (Cross of September Campaign 1939)
Krzyż Pamiątkowy Monte Cassino (Monte Cassino Commemorative Cross)
Krzyż Armii Krajowej (Home Army Cross)
Medal "Zasłużonym na Polu Chwały" (Medal for Merit on the Field of Glory)
Krzyż Partyzancki (Partisan Cross)
Krzyż Czynu Bojowego Polskich Sił Zbrojnych na Zachodzie (Polish Armed Forces in the West Military Action Cross)
Krzyż Bitwy pod Lenino (Battle of Lenino Cross)
Krzyż Oświęcimski (Auschwitz Cross)
Medal "Za udział w wojnie obronnej 1939" (Medal for the War of 1939)
Warszawski Krzyż Powstańczy (Warsaw Cross of the Uprising)
Medal za Warszawę 1939–1945 (Medal for Warsaw 1939–1945)
Medal za Odrę, Nysę, Bałtyk (Medal for Oder, Neisse and Baltic)
Medal Zwycięstwa i Wolności 1945 (Medal of Victory and Freedom 1945)
Medal "Za udział w walkach o Berlin" (Medal for Participation in the Battle of Berlin)
Krzyż Batalionów Chłopskich (Peasant Battalions Cross)
Krzyż Narodowego Czynu Zbrojnego (National Military Action Cross)
Krzyż Zesłańców Sybiru (Cross of the Deported to Siberia)
Krzyż Powstania Warszawskiego (Cross of the Warsaw Uprising)

Yugoslavia
Order of the National Hero (Orden narodnog heroja)
Order of the National Liberation
Order of Bravery (Yugoslavia)
Order of the Partisan Star (Yugoslavia)
Order of Brotherhood and Unity (Yugoslavia)
The Medal of Bravery (Yugoslavia)

Axis Powers and Allies

Nazi Germany

Iron Cross
Knight's Cross of the Iron Cross
German Cross

Romania
Order of Michael the Brave
Order of the Star of Romania
Cruciada împotriva comunismului

Finland
Order of the Cross of Liberty
Mannerheim cross (awarded 1941–1945)
Order of the White Rose of Finland
Order of the Lion of Finland

Non-Participants

Israel 

 Volunteer Ribbon
 Fighters against Nazis Medal
 Decoration of State Warriors

References 

WWII
World War II-related lists
military awards and decorations of World War II